Gradon is an English locational surname, of a location now lost. It can also be spelt Graddon, Gratton, Gredan, Gredden, Gredon, Greydon, Greeding, Gridon and Grodden.

Notable people with this surname
Alexander Gradon, Irish politician
Margaretta Graddon, British singer
Sophie Gradon, English reality TV personality and former Miss Great Britain
Simon Gredon, Archdeacon of Chichester

References

English toponymic surnames